Delmi Tucker (born 5 March 1997) is a South African cricketer who plays for Western Province, Duchesses and South Africa. She made her international debut for South Africa in June 2022.

Career
Tucker attended Hoërskool Menlopark school in Pretoria, where she played hockey and cricket. Tucker went on to play hockey for Northerns, before turning her focus to cricket.

Tucker was part of the South Africa Emerging squad that played against Zimbabwe in May 2021. He all-round performance helped South Africa take an unassailable 3–0 lead in the five-match series. In September 2021, Tucker was again named in the South Africa Emerging squad, this time to play eight matches against Thailand during their tour of South Africa and Zimbabwe.

In May 2022, Tucker earned her maiden call-up to the national team for their tour to Ireland. She was named in South Africa's Women's One Day International (WODI) and Women's Twenty20 International (WT20I) squads following a strong performance in domestic cricket, where she had scored more than 400 runs and taken 15 wickets. Tucker made her WODI debut on 11 June 2022, for South Africa against Ireland, however she was not required to bat or bowl. Tucker made her WT20I debut on 21 July 2022, also during South Africa's series against England. Also in July 2022, Tucker was added to South Africa's team for the cricket tournament at the 2022 Commonwealth Games in Birmingham, England.

References

External links
 

1997 births
Living people
Cricketers from Pretoria
South African women cricketers
South Africa women One Day International cricketers
South Africa women Twenty20 International cricketers
Northerns women cricketers
North West women cricketers
Western Province women cricketers
Cricketers at the 2022 Commonwealth Games
Commonwealth Games competitors for South Africa